The COVID-19 Genomics UK Consortium (COG-UK) is a group of public health agencies and academic institutions in the United Kingdom created in April 2020 to collect, sequence and analyse genomes of SARS-CoV-2 as part of COVID-19 pandemic response. The consortium comprises the UK's four public health agencies, National Health Service organisations, academic partners and the Wellcome Sanger Institute. The consortium is known for first identifying the SARS-CoV-2 Alpha variant (at the time, referred to as Variant of Concern 202012/01) in November 2020. As of January 2021, 45% of all SARS-CoV-2 sequences uploaded to the GISAID sequencing database originated from COG-UK.

In April 2021, COG-UK began the planned transition of sequencing to a national service, with completion by September 2021. COG-UK have stated that their priorities following this transition are data linkage, research and international training.

Impact 
The early and large-scale coordinated national sequencing of SARS-CoV-2 viral genomes, along with the open and rapid sharing of genomic data, had the following impact on the first 12 months of the COVID-19 pandemic response:

 Enabling the identification and monitoring of "Variants of Concern" and "Variants under Investigation" to inform public health actions and policy decisions.
 Tracking the introduction and spread of COVID-19 to inform border control, outbreak management and public health policies.
 Facilitating key UK COVID-19 studies:
 The COG-UK HOCI (Hospital-Onset COVID-19 Infections) study 
 The Office of National Statistics (ONS) COVID-19 Infection Survey (CIS) 
 The Real-time Assessment of Community Transmission (REACT) Study 
 The Vivaldi study 
 The Oxford Vaccine trial 
 The Novavax Vaccine trial 
 Furthering understanding of the biology and evolution of the SARS-CoV-2 virus to guide treatments, vaccine development and diagnostics.
 Boosting the pandemic response through rapid release of genome data and the development of efficient and cost-effective sequencing protocols and open-access public data analysis tools.

In April 2021, COG-UK announced their strategic priorities for the following 12 months:

 To enhance the value of viral genome sequence data through more extensive data linkage, including human genome data and clinical datasets
 To further advance research on SARS-CoV-2 transmission, variants, methods and analysis tools
 To coordinate a global SARS-CoV-2 genomics training programme

Structure 
COG-UK is supported by £20 million funding from the Department of Health and Social Care, UK Research and Innovation (UKRI), and the Wellcome Sanger Institute. The consortium was also backed by the Department of Health and Social Care's Testing Innovation Fund on 16 November 2020 to facilitate the genome sequencing capacity needed to meet the increasing number of COVID-19 cases in the UK over the winter period.

Partners in the consortium include the Wellcome Sanger Institute, the Quadram Institute, and 15 more universities including Queen's University Belfast, the University of Birmingham, Cardiff University, the University of Cambridge, the University of Edinburgh, the University of Exeter, the University of Glasgow, the University of Liverpool, Northumbria University, the University of Nottingham, the University of Oxford, the University of Portsmouth, University College London, Imperial College London and the University of Sheffield.

Key person 
An early proponent and executive director of the consortium is Sharon Peacock, a professor and microbiologist at Cambridge University. From the start of the pandemic to September 2021, Peacock was on a part-time secondment to Public Health England as Director of Science, where she focused on the development of pathogen sequencing through COG-UK.

Developments 
During the COVID-19 pandemic, tools developed by the COG-UK consortium have been widely used, including, for example Phylogenetic Assignment of Named Global Outbreak Lineages (PANGOLIN) and the COG-UK Mutation Explorer. The SARS-CoV-2 Alpha variant was detected in November 2020 by the COG-UK consortium  and the variant became the subject of ongoing investigations by the UK public health agencies, coordinated by Public Health England and supported by COG-UK.

By December 2020, the number of sequences uploaded to GISAID by COG-UK was just under 5% of all UK COVID-19 cases, compared to 3.2% for the United States and 60% for Australia. Approximately 60% of these were sequenced at the Wellcome Sanger Institute and the COG-UK consortium was reported to have understood 'the genetic history of more than 150,000 samples of SARS-CoV-2 virus'.

According to the COG-UK website, by December 2021, the UK had sequenced over 1.8 million SARS-CoV-2 genomes.

Selected publications 
 Lo, Stephanie W.; Jamrozy, Dorota (20 July 2020). "Genomics and epidemiological surveillance". Nature Reviews. Microbiology: 1. doi:10.1038/s41579-020-0421-0. ISSN 1740-1526. PMC 7371787. PMID 32690878.
 Meredith, Luke W.; Hamilton, William L.; Warne, Ben; Houldcroft, Charlotte J.; Hosmillo, Myra; Jahun, Aminu S.; Curran, Martin D.; Parmar, Surendra; Caller, Laura G.; Caddy, Sarah L.; Khokhar, Fahad A. (1 November 2020). "Rapid implementation of SARS-CoV-2 sequencing to investigate cases of health-care associated COVID-19: a prospective genomic surveillance study". The Lancet Infectious Diseases. 20 (11): 1263–1271. doi:10.1016/S1473-3099(20)30562-4. ISSN 1473-3099. PMID 32679081.
 da Silva Filipe, Ana; Shepherd, James G.; Williams, Thomas; Hughes, Joseph; Aranday-Cortes, Elihu; Asamaphan, Patawee; Ashraf, Shirin; Balcazar, Carlos; Brunker, Kirstyn; Campbell, Alasdair; Carmichael, Stephen (January 2021). "Genomic epidemiology reveals multiple introductions of SARS-CoV-2 from mainland Europe into Scotland". Nature Microbiology. 6 (1): 112–122. doi:10.1038/s41564-020-00838-z. ISSN 2058-5276.
 Emary, Katherine R. W.; Golubchik, Tanya; Aley, Parvinder K.; Ariani, Cristina V.; Angus, Brian; Bibi, Sagida; Blane, Beth; Bonsall, David; Cicconi, Paola; Charlton, Sue; Clutterbuck, Elizabeth A. (10 April 2021). "Efficacy of ChAdOx1 nCoV-19 (AZD1222) vaccine against SARS-CoV-2 variant of concern 202012/01 (B.1.1.7): an exploratory analysis of a randomised controlled trial". The Lancet. 397 (10282): 1351–1362. doi:10.1016/S0140-6736(21)00628-0. ISSN 0140-6736. PMC 8009612. PMID 33798499.
 Nicholls, Samuel M.; Poplawski, Radoslaw; Bull, Matthew J.; Underwood, Anthony; Chapman, Michael; Abu-Dahab, Khalil; Taylor, Ben; Colquhoun, Rachel M.; Rowe, Will P. M.; Jackson, Ben; Hill, Verity (1 July 2021). "CLIMB-COVID: continuous integration supporting decentralised sequencing for SARS-CoV-2 genomic surveillance". Genome Biology. 22 (1): 196. doi:10.1186/s13059-021-02395-y. ISSN 1474-760X. PMC 8247108. PMID 34210356.
 Vöhringer, Harald S.; Sanderson, Theo; Sinnott, Matthew; De Maio, Nicola; Nguyen, Thuy; Goater, Richard; Schwach, Frank; Harrison, Ian; Hellewell, Joel; Ariani, Cristina V.; Gonçalves, Sonia (December 2021). "Genomic reconstruction of the SARS-CoV-2 epidemic in England". Nature. 600 (7889): 506–511. doi:10.1038/s41586-021-04069-y. ISSN 1476-4687. PMC 8674138. PMID 34649268.

References

External links
 

COVID-19 pandemic in the United Kingdom
2020 establishments in the United Kingdom
College and university associations and consortia in the United Kingdom
Genetics in the United Kingdom
Genetics or genomics research institutions
Medical responses to the COVID-19 pandemic
Organizations established for the COVID-19 pandemic
Technology consortia
United Kingdom responses to the COVID-19 pandemic